Kevin Bartlett may refer to:

 Kevin Bartlett (Australian rules footballer) (born 1947), Australian rules footballer for Richmond
 Kevin Bartlett (English footballer) (born 1962), English association football player
 Kevin Bartlett (musician) (born 1952), American composer/performer
 Kevin Bartlett (racing driver) (born 1940), Australian former open wheel and touring car racing driver
 Kevin Bartlett (athlete) (born 1981), Barbadian long jumper and sprinter

See also
 Bartlett (disambiguation)